is a Japanese professional footballer who plays as a forward for NWSL club Angel City FC and the Japan women's national team.

Club career
Endo was born in Fukushima Prefecture on 24 May 2000. In 2018, she joined L.League club Nippon TV Beleza from JFA Academy Fukushima LSC.

On 29 April 2022 she assisted the first goal and scored the second in Angel City's first ever regular season game, a win over North Carolina Courage, and was awarded Player of the Match.

International career

Youth 
In 2016, Endo was selected for the Japan U-17 national team for the 2016 U-17 World Cup. She played in four matches and scored three goals, and Japan won second place.

In 2018, Endo was selected for the Japan U-20 national team for the 2018 U-20 World Cup. She played in all six matches and scored two goals, and Japan won the championship.

Senior 
In February 2019, Endo was selected for the Japan national team for the SheBelieves Cup. At this tournament, on 27 February, she played for the first time against the United States.

Career statistics

Club

International

Scores and results list Japan's goal tally first, score column indicates score after each Endo goal.

Honours 
Tokyo Verdy Beleza

 Nadeshiko League: 2018, 2019
 Empress's Cup: 2019, 2020
 Nadeshiko League Cup: 2018, 2019
 AFC Women's Club Championship: 2019

Japan U20

 AFC U-19 Women's Championship: 2017
 FIFA U-20 Women's World Cup: 2018

Japan

 EAFF E-1 Football Championship: 2019

References

External links

Japan Football Association

2000 births
Living people
Association football people from Fukushima Prefecture
Japanese women's footballers
Japan women's international footballers
Nadeshiko League players
Nippon TV Tokyo Verdy Beleza players
Women's association football forwards
2019 FIFA Women's World Cup players
Footballers at the 2020 Summer Olympics
Olympic footballers of Japan
Japanese expatriate footballers
Japanese expatriate sportspeople in the United States
Expatriate women's soccer players in the United States
Angel City FC players
National Women's Soccer League players